Apostropha curvipennis is a species of beetle in the family Cerambycidae, the only species in the genus Apostropha.

References

Rhinotragini
Monotypic Cerambycidae genera